Louis-Auguste-Victor, Count de Ghaisnes de Bourmont (2 September 1773 – 27 October 1846) was a French general, diplomat and statesman who was named Marshal of France in 1830. A lifelong royalist, he emigrated from France soon after the outbreak of the French Revolution and fought with the counter-revolutionary Army of Condé for two years, then joined the insurrection in France for three more years before going into exile. He was arrested after assisting the Georges Cadoudal conspiracy, but escaped to Portugal.

In 1807 he took advantage of an amnesty to rejoin the French army and served in several campaigns until 1814. He rose in rank to become a general of division. During this period, he was suspected of being an agent of the Comte d'Artois and passing information to France's enemies. Though he was notoriously anti-Napoleon and many officers did not trust him, he was employed again during the Hundred Days. Immediately after the campaign began, he deserted to the Prussian army with Napoleon's plans. King Louis XVIII of France gave him a command in the Spanish expedition of 1823.

Promoted to Marshal of France, he was put in command of the Invasion of Algiers in 1830. However, after the July Revolution, he refused to recognize King Louis-Philippe of France and was sacked. After being involved in a plot against the new government, he fled to Portugal in 1832. He led the army of Dom Miguel in the Liberal Wars, and when the liberals won, he fled to Rome. He accepted another amnesty, this time in 1840, and died in France six years later.

Early career
On the eve of the French Revolution, Bourmont entered the Gardes Françaises of the French Royal Army but he emigrated in 1789. Bourmont served in Louis Joseph de Bourbon, Prince de Condé royalist army in the campaigns of 1792 and 1793. Then he served as chief of staff in the civil war in lower Anjou from 1794 to 1796. After fleeing to Switzerland in 1796, he took part in another insurrection from 1798-1800. He was arrested in 1801 because of involvement with Georges Cadoudal, but three years later he managed to escape to Portugal.

When Junot invaded Portugal in 1807, Bourmont offered him his services and was employed as chief of staff of a division. Arrested when re-entering France in 1809, he was released upon the intercession of Junot and employed in the Imperial army.

He served in Italy and on the staff of Eugène de Beauharnais during the Russian campaign of 1812. Taken prisoner during the retreat from Moscow, he managed to escape and rejoin the French army. After the Battle of Lützen in 1813 he was promoted to general of brigade, he took part in the Battle of Leipzig and in 1814 he was promoted to general of division for defending Nogent-sur-Seine. After the fall of Napoleon, Bourmont rallied to the Bourbons.

During the Hundred Days, the government of Louis XVIII of France frantically tried to stop Napoleon's march on Paris. Marshal Michel Ney was ordered to report to Besançon where he was to receive his orders from Bourmont. It irritated the proud Ney, Prince of the Moskva, to take instructions from such a junior general, so he demanded to see the king. During his interview with Louis, Ney boasted to the king that he would bring back the ex-emperor in an iron cage. By the time Ney arrived in Besançon, he found that the royalist position was rapidly deteriorating and that Bourmont's assignment was to spy on him. On 11 March 1815, Ney told Bourmont that he was going over to Napoleon's camp. Shortly afterward, the Bourbon cause collapsed and Louis fled to Belgium, followed by hundreds of royalists.

According to historian David Hamilton-Williams, the Comte d'Artois asked Bourmont to remain a royalist agent, so he requested to continue in command. The new Minister of War, Marshal Louis-Nicolas Davout refused to employ Bourmont, writing to Napoleon, "I cannot sit idly and watch this officer wear the uniform of this country; his treasonous statements concerning the Emperor are well known to all; the brigade and regimental commanders of the 14th Infantry Division despise him. Who would trust such a man?" Nevertheless, Étienne Maurice Gérard, leader of the IV Corps vouched for him so he retained his position.
 
On the morning of 15 June, as the French Army of the North advanced into Belgium, the 14th Division led the IV Corps column of march. Near Florennes, Bourmont halted his division. On the pretence of scouting ahead, he and his staff, rode ahead with a squadron of lancers. After gaining a suitable distance from French lines, he sent the lancers back with a letter for Gérard. In the missive, he explained that he was deserting but promised, "They will not get any information from me which will injure the French army, composed of men I love." He and his staff put the white Bourbon cockade on their hats and galloped for the nearest Prussian position. He immediately handed over Napoleon's operational plans to the Prussians. Gebhard von Blucher's chief of staff August von Gneisenau was pleased to receive this windfall. However, Blucher had no use for turncoats and called Bourmont a traitor to his face. When Gneisenau noted that Bourmont was wearing the white cockade, making them allies, Blucher screamed, "Cockade be damned! A dirty dog is always a dirty dog!"

With Napoleon's orders in their hands, the Prussians were able to take the appropriate countermeasures to gather their army. Bourmont's defection enraged the French rank and file. Though their loyalty to Napoleon was absolute, they began to suspect treachery in their generals. Étienne Hulot, who became the acting division commander, was compelled to give a speech that pledged loyalty to Napoleon and the tricolor.

Bourbon Restoration
After the Battle of Waterloo and Napoleon's fall, Bourmont gave evidence that led to Ney's execution. After the Second Restoration, he was given command of the 16th infantry division in Besançon and took part in the Spanish campaign of 1823. King Charles X of France made him minister of war in 1829 and Marshal of France in 1830. He was commanding the Invasion of Algiers in 1830, involving the shipwreck of Dellys, when the July Revolution broke out in 1830. Bourmont refused to give his allegiance to the new King Louis Philippe and was dismissed from service.

In 1832 Marshal Bourmont took part in the rising of Caroline Ferdinande Louise, duchesse de Berry and on its failure fled to Portugal. He commanded the army of the absolutist monarch King Miguel during the Liberal Wars and after the victory of the constitutional party he retired to Rome. At the amnesty of 1840 he returned to France, where he died on 27 October 1846 at Freigné in Maine-et-Loire.

Notes

References

 Hamilton-Williams, David. Waterloo - New Perspectives: The Great Battle Reappraised. NY: John Wiley & Sons, 1994. 

1773 births
1846 deaths
People from Maine-et-Loire
Politicians from Pays de la Loire
Legitimists
French Ministers of War
Members of the Chamber of Peers of the Bourbon Restoration
Counts of Ghaisnes de Bourmont
Marshals of France
French commanders of the Napoleonic Wars
French counter-revolutionaries
Field marshals of Portugal
Politicians of the Bourbon Restoration